Yuba City (Maidu: Yubu) is a city in Northern California and the county seat of Sutter County, California, United States. The population was 70,117 at the 2020 census. Yuba City is the principal city of the Yuba City Metropolitan Statistical Area which encompasses all of Sutter County and Yuba County. The metro area's population is 164,138. It is the 21st largest metropolitan area in California, ranked behind Redding and Chico. Its metropolitan statistical area is part of the Greater Sacramento CSA.

History

Early history
The Maidu people were settled in the region when they were first encountered by Spanish and Mexican scouting expeditions in the early 18th century. One version of the origin of the name "Yuba" is that during one of these expeditions, wild grapes were seen growing by a river, and so it was named "Uba", a variant spelling of the Spanish word uva (grape).

The Mexican government granted a large expanse of land, which included the area in which Yuba City is situated, to John Sutter—the same John Sutter upon whose land gold was subsequently discovered in 1848. He sold part of this tract to some enterprising men who wished to establish a town near the confluence of the Yuba River and the Feather River, tributaries of the Sacramento River, with an eye to developing a commercial center catering to the thousands of gold miners headed upstream to the gold fields. At the same time, another town was developing on the eastern bank of the Feather River, the beginnings of what later would become Marysville.

By 1852, Yuba City was a steamboat landing, had one hotel, a grocery store, a post office, and approximately 20 dwelling homes with a population of about 150.

Yuba City was chosen as county seat for Sutter County in 1854. The same year, however, voters decided that Nicolaus would be a better location, and the county seat was moved there. County voters returned to their first choice of Yuba City two years later, in 1856, and it has remained the county seat since.

Yuba City saw its first major influx of population after World War II, pushing residential areas west and south from the city's original center. Orchards were turned into residential areas as new homes were built for people migrating to the city.

Flood of 1955
In December 1955, a series of storms dropped torrential rain throughout northern California. The deluge caused all the rivers in the region to overflow their banks and to break through levees. The Christmas Eve levee break at Yuba City was particularly disastrous, with 38 people losing their lives, and heavy damage occurring in the downtown section. According to Dick Brandt, manager of the Yuba County airport in 1955, between 550 and 600 Sutter County residents were rescued from the floodwater by helicopter.

B-52 airplane crash
On March 14, 1961, a Boeing B-52 Stratofortress carrying nuclear weapons, flying near Yuba City, encountered a pressurization problem, and had to drop to a lower altitude. Because of this, more fuel than expected was used, and the aircraft ran out of fuel. It crashed before meeting with a tanker aircraft. The pilot gave the bailout command, and the crew egressed at 10,000 ft, except for the pilot, who ejected at 4,000 ft, while avoiding a populated area. The aircraft was destroyed. The weapons, two Mark 39 (3.8 megatons each) thermonuclear bombs (identified from declassified Department of Energy films and photographs) were destroyed on impact though no explosion took place, and there was no release of radioactive material as a result.

1976 school bus crash

On May 21, 1976, a school bus carrying members of the Yuba City High School's choir to a performance at Miramonte High School in Orinda, California plunged 28 feet off the exit ramp on I-680 at Marina Vista Road in Martinez, California.  Twenty-seven students and one adult chaperone died and twenty-three students were seriously injured.

1978 missing person case

On February 24, 1978, five young men from Yuba City,  Gary Dale Mathias, Jack Madruga, Jackie Huett, Theodore (Ted) Weiher and William Sterling, aged between 24 and 32 years, disappeared under mysterious circumstances. They went to a basketball game in Chico and on their way back drove up to a mountain road away from the main road back to Yuba, where their car had been found later, undamaged and with enough gas to drive back to Yuba City.

Four of the men were later found in and near a trailer on June 4 of the same year. Ted Weiher was found inside the trailer, starved, covered in blankets. Inside the trailer there was enough food to supply all five men for about a year, and enough paper and wood to light a fire, but nothing was used this way. The corpses and bones of three of the other men were found outside the trailer, but Gary Mathias was never found.

1994 mosque burning
Yuba City has been home to a significant Muslim population, including Pakistani Americans descended from  1902 immigrants.  In 1994 the Muslim community completed a mosque that cost an estimated $1.8 million and many hours of donated work. Soon after, the mosque was destroyed by an act of arson, the first time that a mosque was destroyed in the United States.  Eventually the mosque was rebuilt with help of Sikhs, Mormons, Christians, and other groups.  The story is told in the 2012 documentary An American Mosque.

Geography

Yuba City is located at 39°8'5" North, 121°37'34" West (39.134792, −121.626201).

The total area is 0.53% water.

It is home to the Sutter Buttes, the smallest mountain range in the world. The Feather River borders the city to the east and the area is sometimes referred to as the "Feather River Valley", which divides the city from its neighbor Marysville.

Climate
Yuba City has a hot-summer mediterranean climate (Csa according to the Köppen climate classification system) which consists of cool, wet winters and hot, dry summers. On average, January is the coolest and wettest month, and July is the hottest and driest. During the wet season from mid-October to mid-April, Yuba City sees frequent rain and is usually under the tule fog. Snow is rare in the valley, but cold waves from the north may bring some light snow and ice. Spring is wet in the beginning but becomes drier and warmer as summer months approach. May has some rain, but usually from thunderstorms rather than from winter storms. Rain is rare from June to September. The Delta Breeze, which comes from the Bay Area on summer nights, helps cool temperatures and adds humidity. At times the Delta Breeze is strong enough to bring coastal fog inland to the Sacramento Valley. Autumn starts out warm but becomes cooler, wetter, and foggier as the season progresses.

Demographics

2010
The 2010 United States Census reported that Yuba City had a population of 64,925. The racial makeup of Yuba City was 37,382 (57.6%) White, 1,591 (2.5%) African American, 909 (1.4%) Native American, 11,190 (17.2%) Asian, 228 (0.4%) Pacific Islander, 9,772 (15.1%) from other races, and 3,853 (5.9%) from two or more races. Hispanic or Latino of any race were 18,413 persons (28.4%).

The Census reported that 64,345 people (99.1% of the population) lived in households, 125 (0.2%) lived in non-institutionalized group quarters, and 455 (0.7%) were institutionalized.

There were 21,550 households, out of which 9,012 (41.8%) had children under the age of 18 living in them, 11,277 (52.3%) were opposite-sex married couples living together, 2,969 (13.8%) had a female householder with no husband present, 1,412 (6.6%) had a male householder with no wife present.  There were 1,436 (6.7%) unmarried opposite-sex partnerships, and 118 (0.5%) same-sex married couples or partnerships. 4,753 households (22.1%) were made up of individuals, and 1,960 (9.1%) had someone living alone who was 65 years of age or older. The average household size was 2.99.  There were 15,658 families (72.7% of all households); the average family size was 3.49.

The population was spread out, with 18,314 people (28.2%) under the age of 18, 6,630 people (10.2%) aged 18 to 24, 17,575 people (27.1%) aged 25 to 44, 14,810 people (22.8%) aged 45 to 64, and 7,596 people (11.7%) who were 65 years of age or older.  The median age was 33.0 years. For every 100 females, there were 97.9 males.  For every 100 females age 18 and over, there were 95.3 males.

The homeowner vacancy rate was 2.3%; the rental vacancy rate was 7.1%.  36,525 people (56.3% of the population) lived in owner-occupied housing units and 27,820 people (42.8%) lived in rental housing units.

Yuba City also has a large population of Punjabi Mexican Americans.

2000
As of the census of 2000, there were 36,758 people (60,507 as of January 1, 2006), 13,290 households, and 8,944 families residing in the city. The racial makeup of the city was 67.0% White, 2.8% African American, 1.7% Native American, 6.4% Asian American, 0.3% Pacific Islander, 14.4% from other races, and 2.4% from two or more races. 12.5% of the population were Hispanic or Latino of any race. The European population in Yuba City was 0.5% Romanian, 0.3% Italian, and 1.6% German.

There were 13,290 households, out of which 36.7% had children under the age of 18 living with them, 47.6% were married couples living together, 14.3% had a female householder with no husband present, and 32.7% were "non-families."  26.5% of all households were made up of individuals, and 9.7% had someone living alone who was 65 years of age or older. The average household size was 2.70 and the average family size was 3.28.

In the city, the population was spread out, with 29.0% under the age of 18, 10.7% from 18 to 24, 29.4% from 25 to 44, 18.7% from 45 to 64, and 12.2% who were 65 years of age or older. The median age was 32 years. For every 100 females, there were 95.5 males. For every 100 females age 18 and over, there were 91.7 males.

The median income for a household in the city was $32,858, and the median income for a family was $39,381. Males had a median income of $34,303 versus $23,410 for females. The per capita income for the city was $15,928. 18.1% of the population and 14.5% of families were below the poverty line. Out of the total population, 24.8% of those under the age of 18 and 9.5% of those 65 and older were living below the poverty line.

Transportation
Bus service in Yuba City is provided by Yuba Sutter Transit.

The city is served by two highways. California State Route 20 is the major east–west route, running to Marysville to the east, and Williams to the west. California State Route 99 travels south toward Sacramento, and north to Chico.

Economy

Yuba City is home to the largest dried fruit processing plant in the world, Sunsweet Growers Incorporated.  In 1988 Yuba City was home to the California Prune Festival. In 2001 the name was changed to the California Dried Plum Festival and in early 2003 directors announced the end of the festival's 15-year run in the Yuba–Sutter area. This was primarily due to rise in costs, difficulty in securing sponsors, and competition from other festivals.

Being a small town, retail and healthcare make up the largest sectors of the economy. Some other notable employers include the Geweke Auto Group, Hilbers Incorporated, SharpeSoft, Jaeger Construction, Ardent Mills (formerly Andean Naturals) and Nordic Industries, Inc.
Farming is also the most important part of the Yuba–Sutter area.

Top employers
According to the city's 2014 Comprehensive Annual Financial Report, the top employers in the city are:

Arts and culture

Annual events

Sikh Parade
Yuba City is known for its sizeable Sikh community. The Sikh population in the Yuba–Sutter area has grown to be one of the largest in the United States and one of the largest Sikh populations outside of the Punjab state of India. Each year on the first Sunday of November, Sikhs from the United States, Canada, India, the United Kingdom and throughout the world attend the Sikh parade in Yuba City, which commemorates the receipt by Sikhs of their Holy scripture, the Guru Granth Sahib, in 1708. The  parade features floats and a procession of parade participants. The 2005 parade drew an estimated 56,000 people while the 2007 parade was estimated to draw between 75,000 and 85,000 people of both Sikh and non-Sikh background. In 2008, an estimated 80,000 people came out for the event which is now considered one of the largest gatherings in Northern California. In 2012, the parade participants rose to an estimated number of 150,000 people.

California Swan Festival
Yuba City participated in the California Swan Festival, which had been held from 2013 to 2016, November 13–15, with the events centered in adjacent Marysville’s Caltrans Building.

Museums and other points of interest
 Community Memorial Museum of Sutter County

Government

Yuba City also elected the first Sikh American Mayor in the United States, Kash Gill, and Preet Didbal, the first Sikh American woman Mayor in the United States.

Education

Public schools are part of the Yuba City Unified School District. The three high schools in the district are Yuba City High School, River Valley High School, and Albert Powell Continuation High School. Faith Christian High School and Adventist Christian School (http://www.acselementary.org) are private christian schools located in Yuba City.  The Yuba City Charter School is K-12. Twin Rivers Charter is a K-8. St. Isidore Catholic School is a PK-8 parochial school under the auspices of St. Isidore Catholic Church.

Yuba City is in the Yuba Community College District and is served by Yuba Community College in neighboring Marysville.

Media
The main newspaper for Yuba City area is the Appeal-Democrat. The newspaper is printed in Marysville, but serves the entire Yuba–Sutter area. The Sacramento Bee is also widely sold and read in Yuba City.

Although KKCY 103.1, KUBA 1600 AM and 98.1 FM, KETQ-LP 93Q, KKCY-HD2 95.5, KCYC-LP, KOBO, and KRYC-LP are the only radio stations within the city, there is a wide variety of others broadcasting nearby.

Notable people

 Josh Appelt, mixed martial artist
 Frank Bacon, actor
 Guy Branum, actor, comedian, podcaster, and writer
 Richard Buckner, singer-songwriter
 Juan Corona, serial-killer
 Marcie Dodd, singer and actress
 Wally Herger, politician, member of U.S. House of Representatives 1987–2012
 Brad Johnson, actor and real estate developer
Brandun Lee, professional boxer
 Leanne Marshall, winner of Season 5 of Project Runway
 Adrian Molina, Academy Award-winning writer and director of Coco
 John Joseph Montgomery, aviation pioneer, was born in Yuba City
 Michael P. Moran, actor and screenplay writer
 Charlie Peacock, award-winning songwriter, recording artist, record producer – born Charles W. Ashworth
 Chris Petersen, University of Washington head football coach
 Darryl Scott, Los Angeles Angels pitcher
 Brock Stassi, Philadelphia Phillies first baseman
 Max Stassi, Los Angeles Angels catcher
 Rick Stephenson, bodybuilding champion and United States Army Ranger
 Charlotte Stewart, actress
 Preet Didbal City mayor
 Tyler Rich, singer
 Ron Porter, NFL Kicker
 Yuba County Five Five men who went missing in 1978
 William Jennings Capell heir presumptive to the Earldom of Essex

Sister cities
  – Toride, Ibaraki, Japan as determined by Sister Cities International.

See also

 Yuba County, California
 Yuba–Sutter area
 Marysville, California
 Yuba City Astronomical Observatory

References

External links

 

 
Cities in Sutter County, California
County seats in California
Cities in Sacramento metropolitan area
Geography of the Sacramento Valley
Incorporated cities and towns in California
Populated places established in 1849
1849 establishments in California
Sacramento Valley